Methyltryptamine may refer to:

 N-Methyltryptamine
 α-Methyltryptamine